"Nobody Compares to You" is a song by American DJ and producer Gryffin featuring singer Katie Pearlman. It was released on October 6, 2017.

Composition
The song with gentle guitar strokes and piano chimes and the inspiring vocal work, relates a intense amount of euphoria that frees mind and takes to a warm and safe place.

Charts

Weekly charts

Year-end charts

References

2017 singles
2017 songs
Gryffin songs